Justice Davison may refer to:

Andrew Davison (judge) (1800–1871), justice of the Indiana Supreme Court
Denver Davison (1891–1983), justice of the Oklahoma Supreme Court
Henry Davison (judge) (1805–1860), chief justice of the Supreme Court of Madras
Ronald Davison (1920–2015), chief justice of New Zealand